Ultra is a 1991 Italian drama film directed by Ricky Tognazzi. It was entered into the 41st Berlin International Film Festival where Tognazzi won the Silver Bear for Best Director.

Plot
A group of ultras of Rome leaves to Turin, where the guys have to play the game of Juve-Roma. The Romans are greeted with stones by enemies, and the leader of the extremist group: Er Prince, orders his followers to stab the fans of Juventus. The two opposing factions are arrested and are forced to tell the facts to the superintendent. Meanwhile, in the stadium of Juventus, the remaining ultras are locked in a brawl between their enemies with exaggerated stabbings and stones.

Cast
 Claudio Amendola as Principe
 Ricky Memphis as Red
 Gianmarco Tognazzi as Ciafretta
 Giuppy Izzo as Cinzia
 Alessandro Tiberi as Fabietto
 Fabrizio Vidale as Smilzo
 Krum De Nicola as Morfino
 Antonello Morroni as Teschio
 Michele Camparino as Nerone
 Fabrizio Franceschi as Nazi
 Fabio Buttinelli as Mandrake
 Fabio Maraschi as Cobra
 Alessandro Amen as Ketchup
 Claudio Del Falco as Capo Drugo
 Bruno Del Turco as Patata

References

External links

1991 films
1990s Italian-language films
1991 drama films
Films directed by Ricky Tognazzi
Italian association football films
Italian drama films
1990s Italian films